Filippo Magli (born 29 April 1999) is an Italian racing cyclist, who currently rides for UCI ProTeam .

Major results
2017
 2nd Gran Premio dell'Arno
 6th Overall Ain Bugey Valromey Tour
 6th Trofeo Emilio Paganessi
 7th Trofeo Guido Dorigo
2019
 6th Gran Premio Sportivi di Poggiana
2021
 2nd Giro del Casentino
 4th Il Piccolo Lombardia
 10th Ruota d'Oro

References

External links
 

1999 births
Living people
Italian male cyclists
People from Empoli
Cyclists from Tuscany